Leonard Edward DiNardo (born September 19, 1979) is an American former professional baseball pitcher. He played in Major League Baseball (MLB) from 2004 through 2009, with the Boston Red Sox, Oakland Athletics, and Kansas City Royals.

Early years
DiNardo graduated from Santa Fe High School in Alachua, Florida, in 1998. The Boston Red Sox selected DiNardo in the 10th round of the 1998 Major League Baseball draft, but he did not sign, opting to attend Stetson University instead.

Professional career

Road to the majors
DiNardo was selected by the New York Mets in the third round of the 2001 MLB draft; he signed with the team in July 2001.

In 2002, DiNardo played for the Columbia Mets in the South Atlantic League, another Single-A farm team of the Mets. In 2003, he split time between the St. Lucie Mets (Single-A) and Binghamton Mets (Double-A). He pitched well enough to warrant being selected by the Boston Red Sox during the Rule 5 draft on December 15.

Boston Red Sox
As is the requirement with Rule 5 selections, DiNardo would remain on the Red Sox major league roster during the entire 2004 season. He began the season on the disabled list and made his major league debut on April 23 against the New York Yankees in Yankee Stadium, retiring the side in order in the ninth inning. DiNardo spent much of the second half of the season back on the disabled list. With the 2004 Boston Red Sox, DiNardo made 22 appearances (all in relief) compiling a 4.23 ERA in  innings pitched; he did not register a win or a loss. He received a World Series ring for his contributions to the 2004 World Series championship team.

Having satisfied the Rule 5 requirement of keeping DiNardo on the major league roster during 2004, the Red Sox sent the pitcher to the Triple-A Pawtucket Red Sox to start the 2005 season. He was recalled to the major league club five different times during the year. For the 2005 Boston Red Sox, DiNardo appeared in eight games (one start), compiling an 0–1 record with 1.84 ERA in  innings pitched.

In 2006, DiNardo made six starts in place of the injured David Wells. His first MLB win came on May 7, against the Baltimore Orioles. DiNardo spent a lot of time on the disabled list himself, due to a neck injury. With the 2006 Boston Red Sox, he appeared in 13 games (six starts), compiling a 1–2 record with 7.85 ERA in 39 innings pitched.

DiNardo played for Italy at the 2006 World Baseball Classic. To prepare for the  MLB season, he played for the Peoria Javelinas of the Arizona Fall League.

Oakland Athletics

On February 14, 2007, the Oakland Athletics claimed DiNardo off waivers from the Boston Red Sox. With the 2007 Oakland Athletics, DiNardo made 20 starts and 15 relief appearances, logging  innings with an 8–10 record and a 4.11 ERA. During 2007, DiNardo had his first and only MLB hit, a single off of Matt Cain of the San Francisco Giants on June 10. For the 2008 Oakland Athletics, DiNardo made 11 appearances (two starts), compiling a 7.43 ERA with 1–2 record in 23 innings pitched.

Kansas City Royals
DiNardo signed a minor league contract with the Kansas City Royals on December 17, 2008. He spent the last month of the 2009 season in the major leagues; these would be his final MLB appearances. For the 2009 Kansas City Royals, DiNardo appeared in five games (all starts), compiling an 0–3 record with 10.12 ERA in  innings pitched.

DiNardo again represented Italy at the 2009 World Baseball Classic.

Late career
On January 8, 2010, DiNardo signed a minor league contract to return to the Oakland Athletics; the deal included an invite to spring training. He played in the rookie-level Arizona League and for the Triple-A Sacramento River Cats, making 12 appearances (11 starts) with a 3.53 ERA and 2–5 record.

On December 15, 2010, DiNardo signed a minor league contract to return to the Boston Red Sox. However, on April 1, 2011, he was released. On April 14, 2011, DiNardo signed with the Long Island Ducks of the independent Atlantic League of Professional Baseball. DiNardo signed a minor league contract with the Oakland Athletics on May 21, 2011. He played for the Double-A Midland RockHounds and with Triple-A Sacramento, making 19 appearances (13 starts) with a 5.61 ERA and 4–7 record.

In 2012, DiNardo played in Taiwan for the Lamigo Monkeys of the Chinese Professional Baseball League.

DiNardo played for the Lancaster Barnstormers of the independent Atlantic League in 2013, going 5–9 with a 5.25 ERA in 20 games (19 starts). He tossed the franchise's first ever no-hitter on May 8, 2013, against the Long Island Ducks. He retired in August of that year.

Personal life
DiNardo previously lived in Miami and Micanopy, Florida. He has worked as a pitching instructor in Florida (Fort Myers and Naples) and in South Kingstown, Rhode Island. As of April 2021, DiNardo is an in-studio baseball analyst with New England Sports Network (NESN).

Music

DiNardo plays guitar and has been a part of the annual Hot Stove Cool Music concert in Boston for several years. He's performed with Evan Dando (The Lemonheads), Juliana Hatfield (Blake Babies), Joe Keefe and Sebastion Keefe (Family of the Year), Kay Hanley and Stacy Jones (Letters to Cleo), and Bill Janovitz (Buffalo Tom). DiNardo sang back up vocals on the Dropkick Murphys' 2004 hit, "Tessie", along with Bronson Arroyo and Johnny Damon, and on "Dirty Water" off Arroyo's debut album, Covering the Bases. DiNardo played rhythm guitar on "Model Citizen" off Peter Gammons debut album, Never Slow Down, Never Grow Old.

References

Further reading
 Lenny DiNardo interview via YouTube

External links

dinardopitching.com via Wayback Machine

1979 births
Living people
All-American college baseball players
American people of Italian descent
Arizona League Athletics players
Binghamton Mets players
Baseball players from Miami
Boston Red Sox players
Brooklyn Cyclones players
Capital City Bombers players
Gulf Coast Red Sox players
Kansas City Royals players
Lancaster Barnstormers players
Long Island Ducks players
Major League Baseball pitchers
Midland RockHounds players
Oakland Athletics players
Omaha Royals players
Pawtucket Red Sox players
Peoria Javelinas players
Portland Sea Dogs players
Sacramento River Cats players
Sarasota Red Sox players
Stetson Hatters baseball players
St. Lucie Mets players
2006 World Baseball Classic players
2009 World Baseball Classic players
American expatriate baseball players in Taiwan
Lamigo Monkeys players
Gigantes del Cibao players
American expatriate baseball players in the Dominican Republic
Peoria Saguaros players